Rasha Abdullah al-Harazi (Arabic: رشا عبد الله الحرازي; October 1996 – 9 November 2021) was a Yemeni journalist and photographer.

Early life and education 
Rasha was born in 1996 in Hudeidah Governorate. She studied TV and radio at Hudeidah University. After graduation she worked for the Emirati news channels Al-Ain and Al-Sharq.

Assassination 
Rasha was killed on 9 November 2021 in Aden city by an explosion of a device planted on the car carrying her and her husband. Rasha was pregnant when she was murdered. Before her death Rasha received many threats over her job as a journalist. No group claimed the responsibility, but her husband suspected the Houthi forces were behind the explosion.

References 

Assassinated Yemeni journalists
Yemeni journalists
People murdered in Yemen
People from Al Hudaydah Governorate
Yemeni women journalists
1996 births
2021 deaths